Banking foundation is a type of foundation that originated as a bank. The banking reforms split the banks (usually local and community owned savings banks, as a statutory corporation) into limited company and holding company (or banking foundation).

Austria
 ERSTE Foundation

Germany
  - parent of Hamburger Sparkasse

Italy
Fondazione di Sardegna
 Members of Associazione di Fondazioni e di Casse di Risparmio S.p.A.
 Fondazione Pisa
 Fondazione Roma
Fondazione Sicilcassa (defunct)
Fondazione Banca Monte Lugo (merged with other foundations)
Fondazione Cassa di Risparmio di Lugo (merged with other foundations)
Fondazione Compagnia di San Paolo

Norway
 Sparebankstiftelsen DnB

San Marino
Fondazione San Marino

Spain 

 La Caixa

Further reading
 

Banking
Banking foundations